Dontsy is a rural locality in Artyukhovsky Selsoviet Rural Settlement, Oktyabrsky District, Kursk Oblast, Russia. Population:

Geography 
The village is located on the Dichnya River (a left tributary of the Seym River), 57 km from the Russia–Ukraine border, 30 km south-west of Kursk, 14 km south-west of the district center – the urban-type settlement Pryamitsyno, at the еаstern border of the selsoviet center – Artyukhovka.

 Climate
Dontsy has a warm-summer humid continental climate (Dfb in the Köppen climate classification).

Transport 
Dontsy is located 20 km from the federal route  Crimea Highway (a part of the European route ), 0.5 km from the road of regional importance  ("Crimea Highway" – Ivanino, part of the European route ), 10 km from the nearest railway halt 439 km (railway line Lgov I — Kursk).

The rural locality is situated 41 km from Kursk Vostochny Airport, 116 km from Belgorod International Airport and 240 km from Voronezh Peter the Great Airport.

References

Notes

Sources

Rural localities in Oktyabrsky District, Kursk Oblast